Wood Lake is a lake near the town of Wood Lake, Minnesota in Yellow Medicine County. The lake was named for the dense woods originally bordering the lake.

References

Lakes of Yellow Medicine County, Minnesota
Lakes of Minnesota